Sakaria 'Sackey' Shivute (born 10 October 1965) is a Namibian boxer. Shivute competed for Namibia at the 1996 Summer Olympics. Fighting as a middleweight, Shivute lost to Australian Justann Crawford in the first round. He also represented Namibia at the 1994 Commonwealth Games and at the 1995 All-Africa Games, where he won a silver medal.

References

1965 births
Living people
Middleweight boxers
Boxers at the 1996 Summer Olympics
Olympic boxers of Namibia
Boxers at the 1994 Commonwealth Games
Commonwealth Games competitors for Namibia
African Games silver medalists for Namibia
African Games medalists in boxing
Namibian male boxers
Competitors at the 1995 All-Africa Games
20th-century Namibian people
21st-century Namibian people